The Episcopal Church of the Ascension in Sierra Madre, California is an historic church that was built in 1888.  It was listed on the National Register of Historic Places in 1977. It is site #7 on Sierra Madre designated historical landmarks list. There are forty-eight properties listed on Sierra Madre's Designated Historical Properties List.

Current use
The Episcopal Church of the Ascension is still an active parish in the Episcopal Diocese of Los Angeles.

History

The Original 1885 Wooden Episcopal Church of the Ascension in Sierra Madre was destroyed by a windstorm in October 1887.

The church was used as a location in John Carpenter's 1980 horror movie The Fog.

See also

 Episcopal Church of the Ascension (disambiguation)
 Old North Church in Sierra Madre, California

References

External links

 Church of the Ascension, Sierra Madre — website

Churches in Los Angeles County, California
Sierra Madre, California
Episcopal church buildings in California
Churches on the National Register of Historic Places in California
Buildings and structures on the National Register of Historic Places in Los Angeles County, California